Geraldine Dawson is an American child clinical psychologist, specializing in autism. She has conducted research on early detection, brain development, and treatment of autism spectrum disorders (ASD) and collaborated on studies of genetic risk factors in autism. Dawson is William Cleland Distinguished Professor of Psychiatry and Behavioral Sciences and professor of psychology and neuroscience, former director, Duke Institute for Brain Sciences and director of the Duke Center for Autism and Brain Development at Duke University Medical Center. Dawson was president of the International Society for Autism Research, a scientific and professional organization devoted to advancing knowledge about autism spectrum disorders. From 2008 to 2013, Dawson was research professor of psychiatry at the University of North Carolina at Chapel Hill and was chief science officer for Autism Speaks. Dawson also held the position of adjunct professor of psychiatry at Columbia University and is professor emerita of psychology at University of Washington. She is a fellow of the American Psychological Society, American Psychological Association, International Society for Autism Research, and the Society of Clinical Child and Adolescent Psychology.

Education
Dawson received her Bachelor of Science degree in psychology from the University of Washington in 1974 and her Ph.D. in developmental psychology and child clinical psychology from the University of Washington in 1979. In 1980, she was a postdoctoral fellow and clinical intern at the UCLA Neuropsychiatric Institute, where she specialized in neurodevelopmental disorders. She became a licensed practicing child clinical psychologist in 1980.

Career
Dawson has had a career as a scientist and practicing clinical psychologist focusing on autism spectrum disorders and the effects of early experience on the developing brain.

Dawson is currently William Cleland Distinguished Professor of Psychiatry and founding director of the Duke Center for Autism and Brain Development. She directs an NIH Autism Center of Excellence research program at Duke. She formerly directed the Duke Institute for Brain Sciences. Early in her career, Dawson was an assistant professor of child clinical psychology at the University of North Carolina at Chapel Hill and affiliate of the TEACCH (Treatment and Education of Autistic and related Communication-handicapped Children) program from 1980 to 1985. In 1985, she returned to her alma mater to join the psychology department faculty, where she directed the University of Washington Child Clinical Psychology Program (1985–1991; 1999–2004). From 1996–2008, Dawson was founding director of the University of Washington Autism Center, which worked with Microsoft Corporation to set a precedent for companies to provide insurance coverage for autism early intervention. At the UW Autism Center, she was director of three NIH Autism Center of Excellence Awards, which provided funding for a multi-disciplinary autism research program focusing on genetics, neuroimaging, early diagnosis, and treatment. Dawson also founded and oversaw a treatment center for autistic children and adolescents at the UW Autism Center, which provided multi-disciplinary diagnostic and treatment services for autistic children from infancy through late adolescence. Dawson has served as associate editor or editorial board member for seven scientific journals: Clinical Psychological Science, Journal of Autism and Developmental Disorders, Development and Psychopathology, Psychophysiology, Autism Research, Autism Research and Treatment, and the Journal of Neurodevelopmental Disorders.

Dawson's research has focused on early detection and intervention, brain function (using electrophysiology and functional magnetic resonance imaging), and genetic studies in autism. Her early work demonstrated that maternal depression is associated with differences in early brain activity and stress responses of infants and children. Her lab also demonstrated that autism signs can be detected in infants and described differences in early brain functioning in autism. Dawson and her colleagues used home videotapes to study early signs of autism and pioneered the use of electrophysiological techniques to study brain function in very young autistic children. Dawson's lab at the University of Washington described differences in social brain circuitry related to face processing in autism, apparent as early as six months of age, and defined a lifelong brain characteristic of autism. In collaboration with Dr. Sally J. Rogers, Dawson developed and empirically validated the Early Start Denver Model, the first comprehensive early intervention program for young autistic children.

Autism Speaks
Dawson was on faculty at the University of Washington from 1980 to 2008 when she left to become Autism Speaks' first chief science officer. At Autism Speaks, Dawson oversaw $20–30 million in annual research funding, including funding for the Autism Treatment Network, the Autism Genetic Resource Exchange, the Autism Genome Project, and the Autism Tissue Program.

Media and popular press coverage
Dawson's work has been featured in the media, including programs such as the Jim Lehrer NewsHour, PBS Scientific American Frontiers with Alan Alda, The New York Times, among many others. Her research demonstrating that early intervention is associated with changes in brain activity in autistic children was recognized by Time magazine as one of the top 10 medical breakthroughs of 2012. The Early Start Denver Model is described in the January 2014 issue of Scientific American Mind.

Dawson has testified before the United States Senate to advocate for autistic individuals and their families: in 1999 in support of the Children's Health Act of 2000, in 2002 on behalf of the Federation of Behavioral, Psychological, and Cognitive Sciences, in 2009 at the request of the Senate to provide an update on the current state of autism science, and in 2012 in support of a bill to increase access to autism services for military families.

Honors, awards, and appointments
Dawson is a member of the American Academy of Arts and Sciences. Dawson's honors and awards include the Association for Psychological Science James McKeen Cattell Lifetime Achievement Award (2012), American Psychological Association Distinguished Career Award (Div53), Top 1% Most-Cited Researcher Across All Fields, Clarivate Analytics, Tarheel of the Week (2014), Geoffrey Beene Rock Star of Science Award (2010), Autism Hero Award from the Cure Autism Now Foundation (2006), Autism Society of America Award for Research Contributions to the Autism Community (2004), Autism Society of Washington Medical Professional of the Year (2004), Washington Autism Society Achievement Award for Outstanding Service (1996), Autism Society of America Award for Valuable Service (1989) and the Gatzert Child Welfare Award (1977). Dawson has been an advisor to the National Institutes of Health since 1989. She served for two terms on the National Institutes of Health Interagency Autism Coordinating Committee, a federal advisory committee that coordinates all efforts within the Department of Health and Human Services concerning Autism Spectrum Disorders.

References

External links
http://autismcenter.duke.edu
http://www.autismspeaks.org/science/cso-letter
http://dibs.duke.edu/news/announcements/2013/06/11/dibs-welcomes-geri-dawson/
http://psychiatry.duke.edu/faculty/details/0629543

American women psychologists
Living people
People from Schoharie County, New York
University of North Carolina at Chapel Hill faculty
University of Washington College of Arts and Sciences alumni
University of Washington faculty
Year of birth missing (living people)
American women academics
21st-century American women
American child psychologists
American clinical psychologists